The National Coalition Party leadership election, 2016 was held in Lappeenranta, Finland on June 11, 2016 to elect the chair of the National Coalition Party. In the election, Alexander Stubb, the incumbent party chair and Minister of Finance, was defeated by Petteri Orpo, the Minister of the Interior. Elina Lepomäki, a Member of the Parliament, finished third. After the leadership election, Orpo took Stubb's post as the Minister of Finance.

This was the first time when an incumbent chair of the National Coalition Party lost a leadership election.

References 

2016 in Finland
Political party leadership elections in Finland
National Coalition Party leadership election